Jesca Achan (born 12 January 1991) is an Ugandan netball player who represents Uganda internationally and plays in the center position. She was part of Ugandan squad at the 2019 Netball World Cup.

In September 2019, she was included in the Ugandan squad for the 2019 African Netball Championships.

References 

1991 births
Living people
Ugandan netball players
2019 Netball World Cup players